London Scrapbook is a 1942 British propaganda film directed by Derrick De Marney and Eugene Cekalski. It shows the physical devastation that the Blitz caused to London, and humorously communicates the postwar struggles of Londoners to Americans.

The film is preserved at the British Film Institute and was released on the compilation DVD The British Home Front at War: London Can Take It! from the Imperial War Museum.

Plot 
American Bessie Love and Englishman Basil Radford try to sell their short film about life in postwar London, specifically highlighting various rationing measures, including petrol, cigarettes, meat, and beer.

Cast 
 Bessie Love as herself
 Basil Radford as himself
 Leslie Mitchell as himself
 Patricia Hawks, Love's daughter, as herself (uncredited)

References

External links 
 London Scrapbook available for online viewing at the British Film Institute website
 
 

1942 films
Films shot in London
British World War II propaganda films
1940s war films
British black-and-white films
1940s English-language films